Naggar is an ancient town in Kullu district of Himachal Pradesh, India

Naggar may also refer to:
Naggar Castle
Naggar School of Photography
Naggar (surname)

See also
Najjar